Johanna Debreczeni (pronounced Debra Chaney) born 28 April 1980 in Tampere, Finland) is a Finnish singer. She began her career as a tango singer, but now her repertoire also includes evergreens and Finnish pop.

She is the only child of her family, her father being the Hungarian musician Gabriel Debreczeni. Her first major public appearance was in the musical Grease, at the Tampere Music Theatre. She entered the Tangomarkkinat competition three times, reaching the finals in 2002, only the semi-finals in 2003, and becoming Tango Queen in 2004.

The 1998 Tango King Jouni Keronen is her cousin and they often sing together, particularly under the name of Tango Primo, specialising in Finnish tangos in the Argentine style.

She was part of 2010 Tango King Marko Maunuksela's backing group along with Hanna Talikainen (Tango Queen 2008); Esa Nummela (Tango Prince 2000); and Suvi Karjula (who under the old rules would have been Tango Queen 2010, but is now a mere runner-up) in his entry "Synkän maan tango" (Tango of the Land of Melancholy) for the 2011 Eurovision Song Contest. It was not in fact selected by the Finnish TV viewing public.

Performances and competitions

 1997–1998 – Grease, Tampere Music Theatre
 1997–1998 – Tanssiva Savoy, Tampere Music Theatre
 1998 – Gold and Silver, Tampere Music Theatre
 1999 – White Christmas, Tampere Music Theatre
 2002 – Suomen Tähti finals
 2002 – Tangomarkkinat finals
 2002–2004 Sinitaivas concert
 2003 – Tangomarkkinat semi-finals
 2003 – Valkokankaan suosikit music show (Viking Line)
 2003–2004 – Ilta Välimerellä music show (Viking Line)
 2004 – Tango Queen
 2004 – White Christmas concert tour
 2005 – Valentine's Day concert
 2005 – Suomifilmin helmet music show (Viking line)
 2006 – Mr. Finland finals, judge
 2006 – Winter Wonderland music show (Viking line)
 2007 – Joulun kosketus (Christmas church concert)
 2009 – Cumbre se Mundial tango festival, Bariloche, Argentina
 2009–2010 – Onnen Kerjäläiset (musical)
 2010 – Lähtekäämme metsään (children's concert)
 2010 – Lumitango, Tampere
 2011 – Eurovision selection finals (with Marko Maunuksela and others as above)
 2011 – Lumitango, Tampere

Discography

Albums

 2005 – Parempaa
 2008 – Lanteet kertovat sen

Singles

 2004 – Parempaa
 2004 – Ikävä jää
 2005 – Nimi  /  Isä
 2006 – Soittorasia (with Pekka Nebelung)
 2010 – Lähtekäämme metsään (children's)
 2011 – Synkän maan tango (with Marko Maunuksela and others as above)
 2011 – Teemme toisemme paremmiksi

Radio singles

 2006 – En kuole kyyneliin
 2007 – Lanteet kertovat sen
 2008 – Saat katsoo muttet koskettaa

Compilations with other artists

 2002 – Tangomarkkinat 15
 2004 – Tangomarkkinat 17
 2004 – Hittiparaati 9
 2005 – Tähtitaivas 8
 2005 – Kuninkaallista iskelmää 20 vuotta
 2005 – Tanssisuosikit – 40 tanssihittiä
 2005 – Tangomarkkinat 18
 2005 – Joulun tähtitaivas 2 (Christmas)
 2006 – Iskelmä 5
 2008 – Iskelmä 9

References

External links
  

1980 births
Living people
21st-century Finnish women singers
Musicians from Tampere
Finnish people of Hungarian descent